Aureonarius callisteus is a species of agaric fungus in the family Cortinariaceae. The common name of the species is tawny webcap.

Taxonomy 
It was first described by Elias Magnus Fries in 1818 as Agaricus callisteus. Two decades later he transferred it to the genus Cortinarius in his 1838 work Epicrisis Systematis Mycologici.

In 2022 the species was transferred from Cortinarius and reclassified as Aureonarius callisteus based on genomic data.

See also
List of Cortinarius species

References

External links

callisteus
Fungi of Europe
Fungi described in 1818
Taxa named by Elias Magnus Fries